158th meridian may refer to:

158th  meridian east, a line of longitude east of the Greenwich Meridian
158th meridian west, a line of longitude west of the Greenwich Meridian